Strickland is a rural locality in the local government area of Central Highlands in the Central region of Tasmania. The 2016 census determined a population of 13 for the state suburb of Strickland.

History
Strickland was gazetted as a locality in 1973. It was named for Gerald Strickland, Governor of Tasmania from 1904 to 1909.

Geography
The Dee River forms much of the western boundary.

Road infrastructure
The C176 route (Strickland Road) enters from the north and runs through to the south, where it exits.

References

Localities of Central Highlands Council
Towns in Tasmania